Riverside Heights is a neighborhood within the city limits of Tampa, Florida. As of the 2000 census the neighborhood had a population of 2,949. The ZIP Codes serving the area are 33602, 33603 and 33607.

Geography

Riverside Heights boundaries are South Seminole Heights to the north, Hillsborough River to the west, Columbus Drive to the south, and Tampa Heights to the east. A new marker sign has been put up in the middle of the neighborhood.

Demographics
Source: Hillsborough County Atlas

At the 2000 census there were 2,949 people and 1,299 households residing in the neighborhood. The population density was 4,229/mi2.  The racial makeup of the neighborhood was 79.0% White, 14.0% African American, less than 1% Native American, 1% Asian, 4.0% from other races, and 2.0% from two or more races. Hispanic or Latino of any race were about 31%.

Of the 1,299 households 23% had children under the age of 18 living with them, 36% were married couples living together, 17% had a female householder with no husband present, and 9% non-families. 32% of households were made up of individuals.

The age distribution was 20% under the age of 18, 20% from 18 to 34, 24% from 35 to 49, 17% from 50 to 64, and 18% 65 or older. For every 100 females, there were 84.6 males.

The per capita income for the neighborhood was $19,702. About 10% of the population were below the poverty line. Of those, 27% are under age 18.

See also
Hillsborough River
Neighborhoods in Tampa, Florida
Seminole Heights
Tampa Heights
Ybor City

References

External links
Riverside Heights Civic Association
Riverside Heights from Neighborhood Link

Neighborhoods in Tampa, Florida